Gomes de Sequeira was a Portuguese explorer in the early 16th century. It has been suggested by some historians that Gomes de Sequeira may have sailed to the northeast coast of Australia as part of his explorations, although this is disputed.

See also
Theory of Portuguese discovery of Australia
History of Australia before 1901
Portuguese discoveries

References 

Portuguese explorers
16th-century Portuguese people
16th-century explorers
Maritime history of Portugal
Explorers of Asia
Portuguese explorers of the Pacific